Anthanassa crithona, commonly known as the crithona crescent, is a species of butterfly in the family Nymphalidae. It is found in tropical America.

References

Melitaeini
Nymphalidae of South America
Butterflies described in 1871
Taxa named by Osbert Salvin